Lipoveni may refer to:

Lipovans
Lipoveni, a commune in Cimișlia District, Moldova
Lipoveni, a village in Mitocu Dragomirnei Commune, Suceava County, Romania
Lipoveni, the Romanian name for Lipovany village, Lukivtsi, Vyzhnytsia Raion, Ukraine